The 2008 Big Ten Conference football season is the 113th season for the Big Ten.

Preseason
Ohio State was selected as the preseason favorite to win the conference with Wisconsin and Illinois second and third, respectively by the Media. Ohio State running back Chris Wells was chosen as the Preseason Big Ten Offensive Player of the year while fellow Buckeye linebacker James Laurinaitis was named the Preseason Big Ten Defensive Player of the year.

Purdue Head Coach Joe Tiller will enter his final season, while Michigan's Rich Rodriguez will begin his first in Ann Arbor.

In a given year, each Big Ten team will play eight of the other Big Ten teams.  Thus for any given team in a given year, there are two others which will not be competed against.  Below is the breakdown of "no-plays" for 2008:

Team—Does not play
Illinois—Michigan State, Purdue
Indiana—Michigan, Ohio State
Iowa—Michigan, Ohio State
Michigan—Indiana, Iowa
Michigan State—Illinois, Minnesota
Minnesota—Michigan State, Penn State
Northwestern—Penn State, Wisconsin
Ohio State—Indiana, Iowa
Penn State—Minnesota, Northwestern
Purdue—Illinois, Wisconsin
Wisconsin—Northwestern, Purdue

Standings

Rankings

Schedule
August 30:
Akron @ Wisconsin
Coastal Carolina @ Penn State
Maine @ Iowa
Syracuse @ Northwestern
Western Kentucky @ Indiana
Youngstown State @ Ohio State
Utah @ Michigan
Northern Illinois @ Minnesota
Michigan State @ California
Illinois @ Missouri
September 6:
Eastern Illinois @ Illinois
Eastern Michigan @ Michigan State
Marshall @ Wisconsin
Miami (Ohio) @ Michigan
Northern Colorado @ Purdue
Ohio @ Ohio State
Florida International @ Iowa
Oregon State @ Penn State
Murray State @ Indiana
Northwestern @ Duke
Minnesota @ Bowling Green
September 13:
Florida Atlantic @ Michigan State
Louisiana @ Illinois
Montana State @ Minnesota
Southern Illinois @ Northwestern
Iowa State @ Iowa
Oregon @ Purdue
Penn State @ Syracuse
Michigan @ Notre Dame
Ohio State @ Southern California
Wisconsin @ Fresno State
September 20:
Central Michigan @ Purdue
Florida Atlantic @ Minnesota
Iowa @ Pittsburgh
Ohio @ Northwestern
Temple @ Penn State
Troy @ Ohio State
Notre Dame @ Michigan State
Ball State @ Indiana
September 27:
Michigan State @ Indiana
Minnesota @ Ohio State
Northwestern @ Iowa
Purdue @ Notre Dame
Wisconsin @ Michigan
Illinois @ Penn State
October 4:
Indiana @ Minnesota
Iowa @ Michigan State
Penn State @ Purdue
Illinois @ Michigan
Ohio State @ Wisconsin
October 11:
Iowa @ Indiana
Minnesota @ Illinois
Toledo @ Michigan
Michigan State @ Northwestern
Purdue @ Ohio State
Penn State @ Wisconsin
October 18:
Purdue @ Northwestern
Wisconsin @ Iowa
Ohio State @ Michigan State
Michigan @ Penn State
Indiana @ Illinois
October 25:
Illinois @ Wisconsin
Minnesota @ Purdue
Northwestern @ Indiana
Penn State @ Ohio State
Michigan State @ Michigan
November 1:
Northwestern @ Minnesota
Central Michigan @ Indiana
Iowa @ Illinois
Michigan @ Purdue
Wisconsin @ Michigan State
November 8:
Illinois @ Western Michigan
Michigan @ Minnesota
Ohio State @ Northwestern
Penn State @ Iowa
Purdue @ Michigan State
Wisconsin @ Indiana
November 15:
Indiana @ Penn State
Minnesota @ Wisconsin
Northwestern @ Michigan
Ohio State @ Illinois
Purdue @ Iowa
November 22:
Iowa @ Minnesota
California Polytechnic State @ Wisconsin
Illinois @ Northwestern
Indiana @ Purdue
Michigan @ Ohio State
Michigan State @ Penn State

Key matchups

Spring games

April 12
 Michigan

April 19
 Illinois
 Indiana
 Iowa
 Michigan State
 Ohio State
 Penn State
 Purdue
 Wisconsin

April 25
 Minnesota

April 26
 Northwestern

Homecoming games

September 27
Northwestern 22, Iowa 17

October 4
 Michigan State 16, Iowa 13 
 Illinois 45, Michigan 20

October 11
 Minnesota 27, Illinois 20

October 18
 Northwestern 48, Purdue 26
 Penn State 46, Michigan 17

October 25
 Indiana 21, Northwestern 19
 Minnesota 17, Purdue 6
 Wisconsin 27, Illinois 17
 Penn State 13, Ohio State 6

November 1
 Northwestern 24, Minnesota 17

Statistical leaders

Team

Individual

All-Big Ten Conference Team

Awards

National awards
Doak Walker Award
RB Shonn Greene, Iowa

Rimington Trophy
C A.Q. Shipley, Penn State

Lott Trophy
LB James Laurinaitis, Ohio State

Jim Thorpe Award
CB Malcolm Jenkins, Ohio State

Conference honors
Big Ten Offensive Player of the Year
RB Shonn Greene, Iowa

Big Ten Defensive Player of the Year
LB James Laurinaitis, Ohio State

Big Ten Offensive Lineman of the Year
C A.Q. Shipley, Penn State

Big Ten Defensive Lineman of the Year
  Mitch King, Iowa

Big Ten Freshman of the Year
QB Terrelle Pryor, Ohio State

Dave McClain Coach of the Year (Big Ten Coach of the Year)
Coach Joe Paterno, Penn State

Bowl games

Attendance

The overall attendance for the Big Ten was a total of 5,399,659 fans attending 77 contests this year. This meant that conference schools averaged 70,125 fans per home contest this season. Each Big Ten team has seven home games during the season with two exceptions; Indiana played eight games in Memorial Stadium and Illinois played two neutral sites to limit the Illini to six games in Memorial Stadium. Below are the figures for each game, the total for the team's season and the average attendance per game. The rankings below are by average attendance per game.

* denotes Ohio Stadium record vs. Penn State on October 25.

References